Isn't Life Wonderful is a 1924 American silent romantic drama film directed by D. W. Griffith for his company D. W. Griffith Productions, and distributed by United Artists. It was based on the short story "Isn’t Life Wonderful?" in the 1923 book Defeat by Geoffrey Moss and it was also released under the alternative title Dawn.

Plot
As described in a review in a film magazine, among the thousands of refugees who flocked to Berlin was the family of a Polish professor (Alderson) and the days following the war show them in a terrific struggle for mere existence. They manage to get a place to live but their combined resources and the high prices of food during the Great Inflation result in their only being able to get a potato apiece and for long periods they have to subsist on horse turnips. Despite this, the love of one son, Paul (Hamilton), for his cousin Inga (Dempster) is so great that they determine to overcome all obstacles. Inga works overtime in another place and collects a pitiful supply of things for their new home, while Paul alone builds a little hut and finds a little allotment where he grows enough potatoes to keep him through the winter. All is rosy and they start out to harvest their little crop, but are followed by workmen who temporarily made beasts through their hunger and suffering of their families rob them of all. The world looks black, but Inga rises to the occasion and makes Paul realize that they still have each other, and that after all “Isn’t Life Wonderful.”

Cast

Production
Most of the scenes were filmed in Germany and Austria. Only one was filmed in New York at the studio. The film stars Carol Dempster and Neil Hamilton.  The film was a failure at the box office, and led to Griffith leaving United Artists shortly after its run in theaters.

Reception
The film did receive some positive critical notices at the time, but its stock has risen considerably since; it has for some decades been considered one of Griffith's greatest films.

Legacy
The title of the film was spoofed in the Charley Chase comedy Isn't Life Terrible (1925).

Preservation
Prints of Isn't Life Wonderful are held by the UCLA Film and Television Archive, Cinematek (Brussels, Belgium), Filmoteka Narodowa (Warsaw, Poland), Museum of Modern Art, Arhiva Națională de Filme (Bucharest, Romania), George Eastman Museum Motion Picture Collection, and Danish Film Institute (Copenhagen, Denmark).

References

External links

 (30 minute abridgement)

1924 films
American silent feature films
1920s English-language films
American black-and-white films
Films directed by D. W. Griffith
1924 drama films
Films set in Germany
American drama films
Films scored by Louis Silvers
1920s American films
Silent American drama films